Virginia's 8th congressional district election, 2010 was an election held to determine who would represent Virginia's 8th congressional district in the United States House of Representatives during the 112th Congress. The seat contested is located in Northern Virginia, and includes part of Fairfax County, the city of Alexandria, and the entirety of Arlington County. The 8th district had been represented by 10-term Democratic incumbent Jim Moran since 1990. Moran was re-elected to an eleventh term in the November 2, 2010 general election with 61% of the vote.

Background

Former mayor of Alexandria and Democratic incumbent Jim Moran had won the 8th congressional district in every election since 1990. The district usually favors Democratic candidates, and was won by Al Gore in 2000, John Kerry in 2004, and Barack Obama in 2008 by margins sometimes approaching twenty points. Moran has defeated every Republican challenger in similarly large victories.

One Democrat, Ronald Mitchell, filed to challenge Moran for the Democratic nomination and raised over $9,000, but failed to collect the minimum number of signatures required to be placed on the ballot and Moran was nominated. The Republican Party nomination was contested by attorney and former Federal Communications Commission general counsel Matthew Berry and retired U.S. Army Colonel Patrick Murray. Several other candidates had announced their intent to run, including 2008 nominee Mark Ellmore, but they all dropped out at different times, leaving the race to Berry and Murray. Murray narrowly won the June 8th Republican primary by a margin of 52%-48%.

Independent Green candidate and retired U.S. Navy Captain Ron Fisher was also on the ballot in 2010. He took two percent of the popular vote in 2008, and received 2,700 (1.41%) in 2010.

Candidates

Democratic nomination
Jim Moran, 10-term incumbent U.S. Representative
Ronald Mitchell, failed to collect enough signatures to force a primary with Moran.

Republican nomination
Matthew Berry, attorney and former general counsel of the Federal Communications Commission.
Patrick Murray, retired U.S. Army Colonel.
Mark Ellmore, the Republican nominee in 2008, announced in November 2009 that he would challenge Moran again. He dropped out of the race in March 2010 and supported Murray.
Laurence Socci, dropped out of the race prior to the April filing deadline and supported Berry.
Will Radle, left the race before the April 9 filing deadline. Briefly considered running as an Independent, before supporting Murray.

Results

Polling

General election

Campaign
The 8th district election received national attention in October 2010 because of remarks Moran made at a meeting of the Arlington County Democratic Committee on October 6, 2010:

What [Republicans] do is find candidates, usually stealth candidates, that haven't been in office, haven't served or performed in any kind of public service. My opponent is typical, frankly.

Moran defended his performance as a member of congress, saying in an interview with The Washington Post that "The message is that our unemployment rate is half what it is in the rest of the country. We've been judged the best place to ride out the recession... We have the strongest economy in the country, so we don't want to do a whole lot different than what we've been doing." He also attacked his opponent's views on social issues; saying that Murray's opposition to abortion and same-sex marriage was "out of the mainstream in Northern Virginia".

Fundraising

Results

 

Moran easily won reelection on November 2, 2010; despite Republicans taking over the House of Representatives and several other Virginia Democratic incumbents losing their races. In his victory speech Moran said that "The politics of divisiveness and fear have gained ground on hope. We can make no mistake: the next two years are going to be very difficult". Moran also took a few final jabs at his defeated opponent, saying that the combined "lack of civic engagement" and "extremist Tea Party views" doomed Murray's candidacy.

Patrick Murray left open the possibility of another run in his concession speech: "We fought the best fight that's ever been fought in a very tough district, I think what we have here is a huge movement. So what we did is built a foundation, and we'll be back."

References

External links

VA - District 8 from OurCampaigns.com
Race ranking and details from CQ Politics
Campaign contributions from OpenSecrets
 Jim Moran's Record
Official campaign sites
Jim Moran for U.S. Congress (D)
Patrick Murray for U.S. Congress (R)

2010 Virginia elections